Metarctia confederationis is a moth of the subfamily Arctiinae. It was described by Sergius G. Kiriakoff in 1961. It is found in South Africa.

References
Notes

Sources
 

Endemic moths of South Africa
Metarctia
Moths described in 1961